The Kingsland Subdivision is a railroad line owned by CSX Transportation in Northeast Florida. The line begins in Jacksonville at a junction with the A Line near Moncrief Yard.  From there, it heads east and then turns north near Panama Park.  From Panama Park, the Kingsland Subdivision heads north to Yulee on a discontinuous piece of CSX's S Line.  In Yulee, the line connects with the First Coast Railroad, which operates north to Seals, Georgia, on tracks that were previously part of the Kingsland Subdivision prior to 2005.  The line's namesake is Kingsland, Georgia, which is located north of Yulee on the First Coast Railroad.

History

From Jacksonville to Panama Park, the line was originally the easternmost segment of the Jacksonville and Southwestern Railroad which was built in 1899.  In 1904, the Jacksonville and Southwestern Railroad became part of the Atlantic Coast Line Railroad, which would merge with the Seaboard Air Line Railroad in 1967.

From Panama Park north, the line was built by the Fernandina and Jacksonville Railroad, which was organized in 1874 and opened in 1881.  The Fernandina and Jacksonville Railroad would later become part of the Florida Central and Peninsular Railroad (FC&P).  FC&P would charter the Florida Northern Railroad to extend the line north of Yulee to Savannah, Georgia, in 1894 to connect with the South Bound Railroad (which was absorbed by the FC&P in 1893).  

In 1900, the Florida Central and Peninsular Railroad became part of the Seaboard Air Line Railroad, and the line became Seaboard's main line.  The Seaboard would designate the main line between Savannah, Georgia and Jacksonville as the Jacksonville Subdivision. 

Seaboard Air Line became the Seaboard Coast Line Railroad (SCL) after merging with the Atlantic Coast Line in 1967.  The Seaboard Air Line's main line was then known as the S Line after the merger to differentiate it the former Atlantic Coast Line's nearby main line (the A Line).  After the merger, the S Line between Savannah and Jacksonville was renamed the Everett Subdivision.  The Seaboard Coast Line became the CSX Corporation in the 1980s.  CSX abandoned the line from Riceboro, Georgia, to Seals, Georgia, gradually from 1985 to 1986 and redesignated the remaining track to the south as the Kingsland Subdivision.  CSX then leased the line from Yulee north to Seals (and the former Fernandina Subdivision from Yulee to Fernandina) to the First Coast Railroad in 2005.

The S Line south of Panama park was abandoned in the 1980s.  The former Jacksonville and Southwestern Railroad has been used to connect the remaining line to the rest of the Jacksonville Terminal Subdivision ever since.  The original Seaboard Air Line track from Panama Park south to Jacksonville is now the S-Line Urban Greenway.

See also
 List of CSX Transportation lines

References

CSX Transportation lines
Predecessors of the Seaboard Air Line Railroad
Rail infrastructure in Florida
Transportation in Duval County, Florida
Transportation in Nassau County, Florida